Ifigenia in Aulide may refer to:

Ifigenia in Aulide, opera by Domenico Scarlatti, Rome, 1713 to libretto by Carlo Sigismondo Capeci
Ifigenia in Aulide, opera by Caldara, Vienna, 1718 to libretto by Apostolo Zeno
Ifigenia in Aulide, opera by Giovanni Porta, Munich, 1738
Ifigenia in Aulide, opera by Carl Heinrich Graun, Berlin, 1748, libretto by Leopoldo de' Villati after a scenario by Frederick the Great
Ifigenia in Aulide, opera by Vicente Martín y Soler Naples, 1779 
Ifigenia in Aulide, opera by Ignaz Pleyel, Naples Teatro San Carlo, 1785
Ifigenia in Aulide, opera by Cherubini, Turin, 1788

See also
Iphigénie en Aulide, French opera by Gluck